Balopa Rural LLG is a local-level government (LLG) of Manus Province, Papua New Guinea.

Wards
01. Mouk
02. Lipan
03. Sone
04. Parioi
05. Buiat
06. Baon
07. Solang
08. Rei
09. Lako

References

Local-level governments of Manus Province